Gautham Karthik (born 12 September 1989) is an Indian actor who works in Tamil-language films. He made his acting debut in Mani Ratnam's Kadal (2013).

Early life and background
Gautham Karthik was born to actor Karthik and his first wife, actress Ragini. He is the grandson of actor R. Muthuraman. He grew up in Udhagamandalam and graduated from Christ University, Bangalore, when film-maker Mani Ratnam approached him. Before that, Gautham was not connected with the film industry. He holds a bachelor's degree in Psychology, English & Media. In college he performed as a guitarist and vocalist in the band Dead End Street. He married actress Manjima Mohan, his co-star in the movie Devarattam,  on November 28, 2022.

Career
Reports as early as 2003 suggested that actor Karthik was interested in directing a film with his son in the lead role, though the project never took off. During a press conference in December 2009, Karthik revealed that his son, Gautham, would make his debut in Mani Ratnam's next venture after completion of Ratnam's bilingual films Raavan and Raavanan. After a brief postponement and speculation, Mani Ratnam announced that Gautham would make his debut in Kadal in February 2012. Gautham revealed that he initially felt Ratnam had approached him to be a part of the technical crew and was surprised when he was handed the lead role. Gautham briefly took acting lessons from Kalairani and began to shoot for Kadal across regions in South India for close to a year. After the shootings were completed, he was introduced to the media at the music launch event for the Telugu version of the film in Hyderabad. The film opened in February 2013 to mixed reviews, though Gautham Karthik's performance of a deprived youngster caught between the characters played by Arvind Swamy and Arjun was unanimously praised. A critic noted "Gautham delivers in his very first film. He scores in action as well as dance department too", while a reviewer from Rediff.com wrote that the actor "pulled it off with elan", labelling him as "a natural performer and is surely here to stay".

His second film, Yennamo Yedho, a remake of the Telugu film, Ala Modalaindi released in April 2014 to mixed reviews and a lukewarm box office, while Gautham's performance was praised by the critics. His next release was director Aishwarya Dhanush's Vai Raja Vai on 1 May 2015, which opened to positive reviews and was a commercial success. In 2017, he  has worked in five films simultaneously, including Muthuramalingam, Rangoon, Ivan Thanthiran, Hara Hara Mahadevaki and Indrajith.
Following, he has signed Oru Nalla Naal Paathu Solren (2018) which is to be directed by Arumuga Kumar and he is sharing screen space with Vijay Sethupathi for first time. After the box office success of Hara Hara Mahadevaki, Gautham Karthik and Santhosh P. Jayakumar are back with their next release, Iruttu Araiyil Murattu Kuththu (2018). The next one was with his father actor Karthik and his son come together on screen for the first time in Mr. Chandramouli (2018). Following, director M. Muthaiah known for his caste-based movies has joined with Gautham Karthik for a masala of violence coated with family sentiments in Devarattam (2019).

Filmography

References

External links

Gautham Karthik website

Indian male film actors
21st-century Indian male actors
Male actors from Chennai
1989 births
Living people
Male actors in Tamil cinema
Hebron School alumni
South Indian International Movie Awards winners
Christ University alumni